SBI Life is an Indian life insurance company which was started as a joint venture between State Bank of India (SBI) and French financial institution BNP Paribas Cardif. SBI has a 55.50% stake in the company and BNP Paribas Cardif owns a 0.22% stake. Other investors are Value Line Pte. Ltd. and MacRitchie Investments Pte. Ltd., holding a 1.95% stake each while the remaining 12% is free float stake with public investors. The AuM is Rs. 2,623.5 billion.

In 2007, CRISIL Limited, a subsidiary of global rating agency Standard & Poor's, gave the company a AAA/Stable/P1+ rating.

History
The company got incorporated as a public limited company in Mumbai on 11 October 2000 and received Certificate of Commencement of Business from the RoC on 20 November 2000 and got registered with the IRDAI for carrying out business of life insurance on 29 March 2001. SBI Life is listed on BSE And NSE (Stock Exchanges in India) and is a leading Life Insurance company in India. SBI Life started as a joint venture with BNP  Cardif S.A,which is the life and property & casualty insurance arm of BNP Paribas, one of the strongest banks in the world, in 2001. While in its initial stage its business was mainly from bancassurance channel, and gradually developed an agent network consisting of 108261 Insurance Advisors (IAs)and 825 offices across the country as on March 31, 2018 for selling its life insurance products and also collaborated with other distributions channels which include direct sales and sales through corporate agents brokers insurance marketing firms and other intermediaries. The company offers products in individual and group category which includes savings and protection plans addressing the insurance needs of diverse customer segments and has a comprehensive range of plans in life insurance and pension schemes. During financial year 2004-05 company's assets under management (AUM) crossed Rs 1000 crore mark and in January 2005 it launched unit-linked product. In subsequent financial year of 2005-06 it became the first new generation private life insurance company registering profit and posted profit after tax of Rs 2.03 crore for that year.  Its Gross Written Premium (GWP) crossed the milestone of Rs 5000 crores and AUM crossed the milestone of Rs 10000 crore and it also achieved cumulative breakeven wiping out all accumulated losses and also its share capital increased by Rs 500 crore to Rs 1000 crore during financial year 2007-08. Its GWP crossed the milestone of Rs 10000 crore during financial year 2009-10 and in 2010-11 SBI Life's branch network crossed the milestone of 500 branches all over country and further during the financial year 2011-12 the company achieved the milestone of profit after tax (PAT) of Rs 500 crores as it reported PAT of Rs 556 crore for that year declaring a maiden dividend of 5%. The company's AUM crossed the milestone of Rs 50000 crore and the total number of branches in the country crossed 750 during the financial year 2012-13.The company's  GWP crossed the milestone of Rs 15000 crores during the financial year 2015-16 and in the subsequent financial year in 2016-17 SBI Life's renewal premium collection crossed the milestone of Rs 10000 crore and during the year two companies, Value Line Pte Ltd and McRitchie Investments Pte Ltd. bought stake of 1.95% each in the company from SBI.

Key people 

 Mahesh Kumar Sharma as MD and CEO

References

External links
 SBI Life's official website

Financial services companies established in 2001
Financial services companies based in Mumbai
BNP Paribas
State Bank of India
Life insurance companies of India
NIFTY 50
Indian companies established in 2001
2001 establishments in Maharashtra
Companies listed on the National Stock Exchange of India
Companies listed on the Bombay Stock Exchange